Of Winter Born is the debut album from Ignominious Incarceration, a British death metal band signed to Earache Records. The album was released on 9 March 2009, and was produced, mixed and mastered by Scott Atkins at Grindstone Studios in September 2008.

Track list 

 Avarice – 03:51
 Deeds of Days Long Gone – 03:30
 Elegance in Aggression – 03:45
 Saviour – 03:56
 Of Winter Born – 02:32
 Solitude – 03:22
 Dynasty Damnation – 03:58
 Tide of Pestilence – 02:47
 In the Face of Absolution – 03:54
 Elusion of Mortality – 04:05

Bonus disc on limited edition

 The Beginning (demo) – 00:50
 Pray (demo) – 03:02
 I Have Risen (demo) – 03:36
 Condemned (demo) – 03:17

Recording band members 

Andy Wardle – vocals
Steve Brown – guitars
Chris Ball – bass
Sam Baily – drums
Danny Guy – guitar

2009 albums